Oil Creek is a  tributary of the Allegheny River in Venango and Crawford counties in the U.S. state of Pennsylvania. Attractions along the river include the Drake Well Museum and Oil Creek State Park. The stream was named after the oil that was found along its banks before the historic oil strike by Edwin Drake in Titusville, which Oil Creek flows through. Oil Creek is popular with canoeists and fishers. The creek is rated as a beginners creek for those interested in learning how to safely use canoes and kayaks. Oil Creek is a cold water fishery with bass and trout living in its waters.

Watershed

Tributaries

See also
 List of rivers of Pennsylvania
 List of tributaries of the Allegheny River
 Pennsylvania oil rush

References

External links
Real-Time Water Data, Oil Creek at Rouseville (USGS)

Rivers of Crawford County, Pennsylvania
Rivers of Venango County, Pennsylvania
Rivers of Pennsylvania
Tributaries of the Allegheny River